American Vanguard Corporation, through its subsidiary AMVAC Chemical Corporation, is an American producer of agrochemicals and pesticide delivery systems. The company was cofounded by Glenn Wintemute, who stepped down as president in 1994. His son, Eric Wintemute, now serves as Chairman and Chief Executive Officer.

American Vanguard trades on the New York Stock Exchange (NYSE) under the ticker symbol "AVD."

The company operates factories in Los Angeles and Axis, Alabama.

Products have included dichlorvos (DDVP), metam sodium, mevinphos, pentachloronitrobenzene (PCNB) and terbufos.

History
In 1991, over 19,000 gallons of metam sodium manufactured by Amvac Chemical Corporation spilled from a train derailment into Shasta Lake. AMVAC settled resulting lawsuits for $2 million while Southern Pacific Transportation Company paid $30 million in settlements.

In 2001, AMVAC began producing the herbicide DCPA (Dimethyl tetrachloroterephthalate, trade name Dacthal) for the American market.

In 2007, Amvac paid $300,000 in a pre-trial settlement with six workers who were exposed to pesticide dibromochloropropane (DBCP) on a Dole Food Company-operated banana plantation in the 1970s.

In 2017, the company acquired the US rights to abamectin, Chlorothalonil, and paraquat from ADAMA Agricultural Solutions.

In 2018, the company acquired the US and Canada Bromacil business from Bayer Crop Science.

References

Chemical companies of the United States